Psary  is a village in the administrative district of Gmina Woźniki, within Lubliniec County, Silesian Voivodeship, in southern Poland.

The village has a population of 1,304(according the last known outdated census).

The name of the village is of Polish origin and comes from the word pies, which means "dog".

Sports
The local football club is Orzeł Psary-Babienica. It competes in the lower leagues.

References

Psary